Obrium is a genus of longhorn beetles in the tribe Obriini, erected by Dejean in 1821.

Species
The following are included in BioLib.cz:<ref name=Biolib>BioLib.cz: Obrium''' Dejean, 1821 (retrieved 4 December 2021)</ref>

 Obrium aegrotum Holzschuh, 1982
 Obrium akikoae Niisato, 1998
 Obrium albifasciatum Bates, 1872
 Obrium angulosum Bates, 1885
 Obrium arciferum Bates, 1885
 Obrium asperatum Joly, 2010
 Obrium balteatum Hovore & Chemsak, 1980
 Obrium bartolozzii Adlbauer, 2002
 Obrium batesi Hovore & Chemsak, 1980
 Obrium beckeri Knull, 1962
 Obrium bifasciatum Martins & Galileo, 2004
 Obrium brevicorne Plavilstshikov, 1940
 Obrium brunneum (Fabricius, 1793)
 Obrium californicum Van Dyke, 1920
 Obrium cantharinum (Linnaeus, 1767)
 Obrium castaneomarginatum Hayashi, 1977
 Obrium cephalotes Pic, 1923
 Obrium cicatricosum Gounelle, 1909
 Obrium circumcinctum Aurivillius, 1910
 Obrium circunflexum Martins & Galileo, 2003
 Obrium clavijoi Joly, 2010
 Obrium clerulum Bates, 1885
 Obrium complanatum Gressitt, 1942
 Obrium constricticolle Schaeffer, 1908
 Obrium consulare Holzschuh, 2008
 Obrium coomani Pic, 1927
 Obrium cordicolle Bates, 1870
 Obrium costaricum Hovore & Chemsak, 1980
 Obrium cribripenne Bates, 1885
 Obrium cruciferum Bates, 1885
 †Obrium damgaardi Vitali, 2015
 Obrium dimidiatum Hovore & Chemsak, 1980
 Obrium discoideum (LeConte, 1873)
 Obrium dominicum Linsley, 1957
 Obrium elongatum Niisato, 1998
 Obrium facetum Holzschuh, 1989
 Obrium filicorne Holzschuh, 2008
 Obrium formosanum Schwarzer, 1925
 Obrium fractum Holzschuh, 2003
 Obrium fumigatum Holzschuh, 1995
 Obrium fuscoapicale Hayashi, 1974
 Obrium giesberti Hovore & Chemsak, 1980
 Obrium glabrum Knull, 1937
 Obrium hainanum Niisato & Hua, 1998
 Obrium hattai Ohbayashi & Ohbayashi, 1965
 Obrium helvolum Holzschuh, 2008
 Obrium huae Niisato, 1998
 Obrium invenustum Holzschuh, 2008
 Obrium kusamai Takakuwa, 1984
 Obrium latecinctum Joly, 2010
 Obrium longicolle Jordan, 1894
 Obrium maculatum (Olivier, 1795)
 Obrium madidum Holzschuh, 2011
 Obrium mendosum Holzschuh, 2010
 Obrium miranda Niisato, 2009
 Obrium mozinnae Linell, 1897
 Obrium multifarium Berg, 1889
 Obrium nakanei Ohbayashi, 1959
 Obrium obliquum Martins & Galileo, 2003
 Obrium obscuripenne Pic, 1904
 Obrium oculatum Niisato & Hua, 1998
 Obrium pallidisignatum Hayashi, 1977
 Obrium peculiare Martins & Galileo, 2011
 Obrium peninsulare Schaeffer, 1908
 Obrium piperitum Bates, 1885
 Obrium planicolle Hovore & Chemsak, 1980
 Obrium posticum Gahan, 1894
 Obrium prosperum Holzschuh, 2008
 Obrium quadrifasciatum Zajciw, 1965
 Obrium randiae Gardner, 1926
 Obrium rubidum LeConte, 1850
 Obrium rudebecki Tippmann, 1959
 Obrium ruficolle Bates, 1885
 Obrium rufograndum Gressitt, 1937
 Obrium rufulum Gahan, 1908
 Obrium schwarzeri Hayashi, 1974
 Obrium semidiffusum Joly, 2010
 Obrium semiformosanum (Hayashi, 1974)
 Obrium takahashii Kusama & Takakuwa, 1984
 Obrium tavakiliani Adlbauer, 2003
 Obrium trifasciatum Bosq, 1951
 Obrium unicolor Gardner, 1936
 Obrium vicinum Gounelle, 1909
 Obrium xanthum'' Hovore & Chemsak, 1980

References

External links
 

Obriini